Inteligencia de la Policía Federal Argentina (Argentine Federal Police Intelligence) is the intelligence agency of the Policía Federal Argentina, and it is controlled by the Ministry of the Interior.

Its US counterpart would be the FBI, whereas the state intelligence agency SIDE can be compared with the CIA.

See also
List of Secretaries of Intelligence
Argentine intelligence agencies
National Intelligence System
National Intelligence School
Directorate of Judicial Surveillance
National Directorate of Criminal Intelligence
National Directorate of Strategic Military Intelligence

Federal law enforcement agencies of Argentina
Argentine intelligence agencies